Pleasant Plains High School is a public high school located in Pleasant Plains, Illinois, United States. It is part of Pleasant Plains Community Unit School District No. 8. The school was built in 1927.

When the new buses were bought in 1941 they added Salisbury to the Pleasant Plains (Township High School at the time) district.  This caused Salisbury High School to close and the students transferred to Pleasant Plains.

Pleasant Plains High School used to be called Pleasant Plains Township High School.

Demographics
 Student Population: 451
 Percent ethnicity:
99.0% Caucasian
0.8% African American
0% Hispanic
.2% Asian
0% Multi-Racial

 Student to teacher ratio: 12 students - 1 teachers
 Male to female percentages: 54% male 46% female
 Percent of students who drive to school: 42%

Fall 
 Boys golf
 Girls golf
 Boys cross
 Girls cross country
 Football
 Boys soccer
 Volleyball

Winter 
 Boys basketball
 Girls basketball

Spring 
 Baseball
 Girls soccer
 Softball
 Boys track
 Girls track

References

External links
Pleasant Plains High School website

Educational institutions in the United States with year of establishment missing
Public high schools in Illinois
Schools in Sangamon County, Illinois